The 2010 edition of the Vuelta Mexico Telmex was won by Óscar Sevilla of Rock Racing Team.

Jersey Holders

Teams

 Amore & Vita Conad
 Arenas Tlaxcala
 Bocaya Orgullo de América
 Canel's Turbo
 CKT Champion System
 Empacadora San Marcos
 ISD Neri
 Orven
 PRODEG CEDAJ Guanajuato
 Rock Racing
 Selección Chiapas Tequila Afamado
 Selección Cuba
 Selección Guatemala
 Selección Venezuela
 Spider Tech by Planet Energy
 Team Concordia Forsikring
 Team Kuota Indeland
 Team Raleigh
 Team Type One
 Veracruz

Results by stage

General Classification

References
Nuestro Ciclismo

Vuelta Mexico Telmex
Vuelta Mexico Telmex